Kholdynka is a rural locality (a village) in Nizhneslobodskoye Rural Settlement, Vozhegodsky District, Vologda Oblast, Russia. The population was 55 as of 2002.

Geography 
Kholdynka is located 48 km east of Vozhega (the district's administrative centre) by road. Fedyuninskaya is the nearest rural locality.

References 

Rural localities in Vozhegodsky District